Rustam Raçaʙovic Kurbanov (born 12 June 1966) is a former Tajikistani international footballer and current Youth Team Head Coach at Istiklol.

Career

Coaching
On 7 March 2022, Kurbanov was appointed as the Youth Team Head Coach at Istiklol.

Career statistics

International

Statistics accurate as of 7 August 1999

Honours
Sitora Dushanbe
Tajik League (2): 1993, 1994
Tajik Cup (1): 1993
Varzob Dushanbe
Tajik League (3): 1998, 1999, 2000,
Tajik Cup (2): 1998, 1999

References

External links
 
 

1966 births
Living people
Tajikistani footballers
Tajikistan international footballers
Association football midfielders
Tajikistani expatriate footballers
Expatriate footballers in Belarus